Termini can refer to:
Termini Station (Rome), a main line railway station in Rome
Termini (Rome Metro), an underground railway station in Rome
Termini Imerese, a town in Sicily
 Termini, a frazione of Massa Lubrense, Campania, Italy

See also
Terminus (disambiguation), the singular of termini (although these Termini above in Italian come from Latin plural of thermae, "sauna")
Terminal (disambiguation)